Cecinothofagus ibarrai is a species of gall wasp. Cecinothofagus species are thought to be parasitoids or lethal inhabitants of galls induced by species of Aditrochus on Nothofagus.

References

Further reading

Medianero, Enrique, Héctor Barrios, and José Luis Nieves-Aldrey. "Gall-Inducing Insects and Their Associated Parasitoid Assemblages in the Forests of Panama." Neotropical Insect Galls. Springer Netherlands, 2014. 465–496.
Quintero, Carolina, et al. "Galls of the Temperate Forest of Southern South America: Argentina and Chile." Neotropical Insect Galls. Springer Netherlands, 2014. 429–463.

External links

Cynipidae
Gall-inducing insects
Insects described in 2009